Philippe Janvier (born Jacques Philippe Nugeyre, in 1903 in Paris, died in 1967 in Cognac, Charente) was a French actor.

Partial filmography 
 L'ange gardien (1934)
 Adventure in Paris (1936)
 The Assault (1936)
 Mercadet (a.k.a. Le faiseur) (1936) as La Brive
 Les petites alliées (1936)
 The Five Cents of Lavarede (1939) as Le conspirateur
 The Atomic Monsieur Placido (1950) as L'impresario
 Three Sailors (1957)

References

External links 
 

French male actors
1903 births
1967 deaths